Thomas Blackstock may refer to:

Thomas M. Blackstock (1834–1913), Irish-American politician and businessman
Tommy Blackstock (1882–1907), Scottish footballer